Anne Digby (born 5 May 1943 in Kingston upon Thames, Surrey) is a prolific British children's writer best known for the Trebizon series published between 1978 and 1994.

Digby attended North London Collegiate School before becoming a magazine journalist, and lived in Paris for a time. She then worked as a press officer for Oxfam in Oxford. Her first novel was A Horse Called September (1975). From 1978 to 1994 she wrote fourteen school story novels set in the fictional Cornish boarding school Trebizon. She has also written the Me, Jill Robinson series of books, the Jug Valley Juniors series, Quicksilver Horse and The Big Swim of the Summer. She added six books to Enid Blyton's 1940–52 Naughtiest Girl series, 1999 to 2001 – which publisher Hachette catalogues as Naughtiest Girl, volumes 5 to 10 – and created the Three R Detective books for younger readers.

Fidra Books of Edinburgh has published a collector's edition of Fifth Year Friendships at Trebizon, which has a foreword by Digby, while new mass-market paperback editions of the first seven titles in the Trebizon series were published by Egmont in 2016 with more titles scheduled for 2017. All fourteen titles in the series also remain widely available as e-books.

She formerly lived in Dorset but now lives in East Sussex.

References

1943 births
Living people
English children's writers
People from Kingston upon Thames
People educated at North London Collegiate School